Bolton is a town in Hinds County, Mississippi, United States. The population was 567 at the 2010 census, down from 629 at the 2000 census. It is part of the Jackson Metropolitan Statistical Area.

Geography
Bolton is in north-central Hinds County, in the valley of Bakers Creek, part of the Big Black River watershed. Interstate 20 runs through the northern part of the town, with access from Exit 27. I-20 leads east  to Jackson, the state capital, and west  to Vicksburg.

Demographics

2020 census

As of the 2020 United States census, there were 441 people, 271 households, and 201 families residing in the town.

2010 census
As of the 2010 United States Census, there were 567 people living in the town. The racial makeup of the town was 73.2% Black, 26.3% White and 0.4% from two or more races. 0.2% were Hispanic or Latino of any race.

2000 census
As of the census of 2000, there were 629 people, 246 households, and 157 families living in the town. The population density was 410.4 people per square mile (158.7/km2). There were 261 housing units at an average density of 170.3 per square mile (65.9/km2). The racial makeup of the town was 66.77% African American, 31.64% White and 1.59% from two or more races. Hispanic or Latino of any race were 0.32% of the population.

There were 246 households, out of which 29.3% had children under the age of 18 living with them, 34.6% were married couples living together, 24.4% had a female householder with no husband present, and 35.8% were non-families. 32.1% of all households were made up of individuals, and 13.8% had someone living alone who was 65 years of age or older. The average household size was 2.56 and the average family size was 3.28.

In the town, the population was spread out, with 28.9% under the age of 18, 8.4% from 18 to 24, 27.8% from 25 to 44, 19.2% from 45 to 64, and 15.6% who were 65 years of age or older. The median age was 36 years. For every 100 females there were 85.5 males. For every 100 females age 18 and over, there were 72.6 males.

The median income for a household in the town was $28,833, and the median income for a family was $50,208. Males had a median income of $27,159 versus $24,479 for females. The per capita income for the town was $27,271. About 15.5% of families and 21.4% of the population were below the poverty line, including 37.3% of those under age 18 and 14.7% of those age 65 or over.

Education
Bolton is served by the Hinds County School District, and is zoned to Bolton/Edwards Elementary-Middle School and Raymond High School in Raymond.

Jackson/Hinds Library System operates the Annie Thompson Jeffers Library in Bolton.

Notable people
 Bo Carter, early blues singer and guitarist
 Sam Chatmon, Delta blues guitarist
 Robert Crook, Mississippi politician and lawyer
 Deborah Butler Dixon, member of the Mississippi House of Representatives from 2012 to 2020
 Sasha Goodlett, professional basketball player
 Cleveland Green, former NFL player for the Miami Dolphins
 Alan Huffman, writer and journalist (Mississippi in Africa)
 Charley Patton, early blues musician
 Calvin Smith, Olympic gold and bronze medal winning athlete
 Lucille Spann, Chicago Blues singer
 Bennie Thompson, member of the United States House of Representatives
 Cap Tyson, Negro league baseball player
 Walter Vinson, jazz singer and guitarist

References

 
Towns in Mississippi
Towns in Hinds County, Mississippi